Joseph Eugene Wright (born April 1, 1963) is an American former professional basketball player. Wright holds the single season scoring record in the Úrvalsdeild karla when he averaged 46.6 points per game during the 1992–1993 season. In 1992 he set the single game scoring record in the Korisliiga when he scored 79 points.

College career
Wright played college basketball for Kansas State University. On January 23, 1985, he made 11 of 11 field goals against Oklahoma State, setting a Big 8 Conference record. Wright was named Big 8 Player of the Week in both 1985 and 1986.

Club career
Wright started his professional career in Austria in 1988. He played in Germany before signing with Turun NMKY in Finland in 1991.

Finland
Wright played Turun NMKY for one and a half season. In 1991–1992 he led the Korisliiga in scoring, averaging a league leading 44.1 points per game and finishing second in three point percent with 47,1%

On February 12, 1992, Wright set the Korisliiga single game scoring record when he scored 79 points against Pantterit.

Iceland
Wright joined Úrvalsdeild club Breiðablik in January 1993. In his first game, he scored 55 points in a 108-110 loss against Keflavík and followed it up by scoring 53 points against Haukar in his next game. On 29 January, Wright led Breiðablik to its second victory of the season by scoring 67 points against Njarðvík, the second highest single game scoring in the Úrvalsdeild karla history. In his first five games, he averaged 52.8 points per game. In February, he was selected for the Icelandic All-Star game. For the season he averaged a league leading 44.1 points per game but was unable to help Breiðablik stave of relegation.

In September 1994, Wright Joined Grindavík and played with them two games against M7 Basket in the FIBA Korać Cup. In the two games he scored 33 and 27 points.

References

External links
Joe Wright profile at latinbaslet.com
Joe Wright Korisliiga stats at korisliiga.fi
Joe Wright Úrvalsdeild stats at kki.is
Joe Wright - FIBA Europe profile at fibaeurope.com
NCAA stats at sports-reference.com
Joe Wright - SFCC Roadrunners profile

1963 births
Living people
Algodoneros de la Comarca players
American expatriate basketball people in the Dominican Republic
American expatriate basketball people in Finland
American expatriate basketball people in Iceland
American expatriate basketball people in Mexico
American men's basketball players
Basketball players from Missouri
Breiðablik men's basketball players
Grindavík men's basketball players
Guards (basketball)
Junior college men's basketball players in the United States
Kansas State Wildcats men's basketball players
Leñadores de Durango players
People from Carthage, Missouri
Úrvalsdeild karla (basketball) players